In theoretical physics and mathematics, a Wess–Zumino–Witten (WZW) model, also called a Wess–Zumino–Novikov–Witten model, is a type of two-dimensional conformal field theory named after Julius Wess, Bruno Zumino, Sergei Novikov and Edward Witten. A WZW model is associated to a Lie group (or supergroup), and its symmetry algebra is the affine Lie algebra built from the corresponding Lie algebra (or Lie superalgebra). By extension, the name WZW model is sometimes used for any conformal field theory whose symmetry algebra is an affine Lie algebra.

Action

Definition

The model is a nonlinear sigma model whose action is a functional of a field :

The Wess–Zumino term of the action is

Topological properties of the Wess–Zumino term

This requires the homotopy group  to be trivial, which is the case in particular for any compact Lie group . 

For the WZW model to be well-defined,  
should not depend on the choice of the extension. 
Possible homotopy classes are controlled by the homotopy group .

For any compact, connected simple Lie group , we have , and different extensions of  lead to values of  that differ by integers. Therefore, they lead to the same value of  provided the level obeys 

Integer values of the level also play an important role in the representation theory of the model's symmetry algebra, which is an affine Lie algebra. If the level is a positive integer, the affine Lie algebra has unitary highest weight representations with highest weights that are dominant integral. Such representations decompose into finite-dimensional subrepresentations with respect to the subalgebras spanned by each simple root, the corresponding negative root and their commutator, which is a Cartan generator. 

In the case of the noncompact simple Lie group ,
the homotopy group  is trivial, and the level is not constrained to be an integer.

Geometrical interpretation of the Wess–Zumino term

If ea are the basis vectors for the Lie algebra, then  are the structure constants of the Lie algebra. The structure constants are completely anti-symmetric, and thus they define a 3-form on the group manifold of G. Thus, the integrand above is just the pullback of the harmonic 3-form to the ball  Denoting the harmonic 3-form by c and the pullback by  one then has 

This form leads directly to a topological analysis of the WZ term.

Geometrically, this term describes the torsion of the respective manifold. The presence of this torsion compels teleparallelism of the manifold, and thus trivialization of the torsionful curvature tensor; and hence arrest of the renormalization flow, an infrared fixed point of the renormalization group, a phenomenon termed geometrostasis.

Symmetry algebra

Generalised group symmetry

This symmetry is often called the  symmetry.

One way to prove the existence of this symmetry is through repeated application of the Polyakov–Wiegmann identity regarding products of -valued fields:

The singular behaviour of the products of these currents with other quantum fields determine how those fields transform under infintessimal actions of the  group.

Affine Lie algebra

We have the following operator product expansion:

 

where  are the coefficients such that . 
Equivalently, if  is expanded in modes 

 

The commutation relations of the affine Lie algebra are 

 

This affine Lie algebra is the chiral symmetry algebra associated to the left-moving currents . A second copy of the same affine Lie algebra is associated to the right-moving currents . The generators  of that second copy are antiholomorphic. The full symmetry algebra of the WZW model is the product of the two copies of the affine Lie algebra.

Sugawara construction

The Sugawara construction is an embedding of the Virasoro algebra into the universal enveloping algebra of the affine Lie algebra. The existence of the embedding shows that WZW models are conformal field theories. Moreover, it leads to Knizhnik–Zamolodchikov equations for correlation functions.

The Sugawara construction is most concisely written at the level of the currents:  for the affine Lie algebra, and the  energy-momentum tensor  for the Virasoro algebra: 

 

which is equivalent to the Virasoro algebra's commutation relations. The central charge of the Virasoro algebra is given in terms of the level  of the affine Lie algebra by 

At the level of the generators of the affine Lie algebra, the Sugawara construction reads 

 

where the generators  of the Virasoro algebra are the modes of the energy-momentum tensor, .

Spectrum

WZW models with compact, simply connected groups
If the Lie group  is compact and simply connected, then the WZW model is rational and diagonal: rational because the spectrum is built from a (level-dependent) finite set of irreducible representations of the affine Lie algebra called the integrable highest weight representations, and diagonal because a representation of the left-moving algebra is coupled with the same representation of the right-moving algebra.  

For example, the spectrum of the  WZW model at level  is 

where  is the affine highest weight representation of spin : a representation generated by a state  such that 

WZW models with other types of groups

If the group  is compact but not simply connected, the WZW model is rational but not necessarily diagonal. For example, the  WZW model exists for even integer levels , and its spectrum is a non-diagonal combination of finitely many integrable highest weight representations.

If the group  is not compact, the WZW model is non-rational. Moreover, its spectrum may include non highest weight representations. For example, the spectrum of the  WZW model is built from highest weight representations, plus their images under the spectral flow automorphisms of the affine Lie algebra.

If  is a supergroup, the spectrum may involve representations that do not factorize as tensor products of representations of the left- and right-moving symmetry algebras. This occurs for example in the case ,
Non-factorizable representations are responsible for the fact that the corresponding WZW models are logarithmic conformal field theories.

Other theories based on affine Lie algebras

The known conformal field theories based on affine Lie algebras are not limited to WZW models.
For example, in the case of the affine Lie algebra of the  WZW model, modular invariant torus partition functions obey an ADE classification, where the  WZW model accounts for the A series only. The D series corresponds to the  WZW model, and the E series does not correspond to any WZW model.

Another example is the  model. This model is based on the same symmetry algebra as the  WZW model, to which it is related by Wick rotation.

Fields and correlation functions

Fields

An affine primary field is also a primary field for the Virasoro algebra that results from the Sugawara construction. The conformal dimension of the affine primary field is given in terms of the quadratic Casimir  of the representation  (i.e. the eigenvalue of the quadratic Casimir element  where  is the inverse of the matrix  of the Killing form) by 

For example, in the  WZW model, the conformal dimension of a primary field of spin  is 

By the state-field correspondence, affine primary fields correspond to affine primary states, which are the highest weight states of highest weight representations of the affine Lie algebra.

Correlation functions
If the group  is compact, the spectrum of the WZW model is made of highest weight representations, and all correlation functions can be deduced from correlation functions of affine primary fields via Ward identities.

If the Riemann surface  is the Riemann sphere, correlation functions of affine primary fields obey Knizhnik–Zamolodchikov equations. On Riemann surfaces of higher genus, correlation functions obey Knizhnik–Zamolodchikov–Bernard equations, which involve derivatives not only of the fields' positions, but also of the surface's moduli.

Gauged WZW models

Applications

The WZW model whose Lie group is the universal cover of the group  has been used by Juan Maldacena and Hirosi Ooguri to describe bosonic string theory on the three-dimensional anti-de Sitter space .

WZW models and their deformations have been proposed for describing 
the plateau transition in the integer quantum Hall effect. 

The  gauged WZW model has an interpretation in string theory as Witten's two-dimensional Euclidean black hole.
The same model also describes certain two-dimensional statistical systems at criticality, such as the critical antiferromagnetic Potts model.

References

Conformal field theory
Lie groups
Exactly solvable models
Mathematical physics